The delegate model of representation is a model of a representative democracy. In this model, constituents elect their representatives as delegates for their constituency. These delegates act only as a mouthpiece for the wishes of their constituency/state and have no autonomy from the constituency only the autonomy to vote for the actual representatives of the state. This model does not provide representatives the luxury of acting in their own conscience and is bound by imperative mandate. Essentially, the representative acts as the voice of those who are (literally) not present.

History
This model was contested by Edmund Burke (1729–1797), an Irish philosopher, who supported the alternative trustee model of representation. His famous refusal to accept instructions from his Bristol electors was necessitated by his conscientious objection to voting in Parliament for laws supporting their lucrative and immoral slave trade.

The delegate model of representation is made use of in various forms of council democracy and commune democracy. Models of democratic rule making extensive use of delegate model of representation are often labeled delegative democracy.

Guillermo O'Donnell has used the term "delegative democracy" to criticize authoritarian tendencies in newly created democratic states.

Further reading
Burke, Edmund. 1774 (1906). Speech to the electors of Bristol in The Works of the Right Honorable Edmund Burke. Vol. II. New York: Oxford University Press.

See also
Trustee model of representation
Delegative democracy
Imperative mandate

References

External links
'Representative Government' by J.S. Mill
'On Liberty' by J.S Mill

Types of democracy
Political philosophy